The Sackville Gallery was an art gallery at 28 Sackville Street, London, best known for hosting the exhibition of Futurist art in 1912.

The gallery opened in May 1908. It was owned and run by Max Rothschild and Robert René Meyer-Sée until Meyer-Sée left to run the Marlborough Gallery in August 1912. The gallery specialised in the sale of old master works and the Futurist exhibition was untypical of its activities.

The gallery closed in 1939.

See also
Gilbert de Rorthays

References

External links
The Futurist Contagion: British Cartoons and the 1912 Futurist Exhibition in London. Guggenheim.
The Sackville Gallery – Old Masters and Avant-Garde in London. The Burlington Magazine Index Blog.

1908 establishments in England
Defunct art galleries in London
1939 disestablishments in England